Plawenia a genus of solenogasters, shell-less, worm-like, marine mollusks.

Species
 Plawenia argentinensis Scheltema & Schander, 2000
 Plawenia schizoradulata (Salvini-Plawen, 1978)
 Plawenia sphaera Scheltema & Schander, 2000

References

 Scheltema, A. H.; Schander, C. (2000). Discrimination and phylogeny of Solenogaster species through the morphology of hard parts (Mollusca, Aplacophora, Neomeniomorpha). Biological Bulletin. 198: 121-151.

External links
 Neave, Sheffield Airey. (1939-1996). Nomenclator Zoologicus vol. 1-10 Online
 Check List of European Marine Mollusca (CLEMAM)

Solenogastres